Europa Capital is a real estate investment firm headquartered in London, United Kingdom.

History
Europa Capital was founded by Sir John Beckwith in 1995. By 2010, Beckwith had sold the firm to its partners, and it had over Euro 2 billion of assets under management. It is now owned by the Rockefeller Group, a subsidiary of the Mitsubishi Estate.

References

Companies based in the Royal Borough of Kensington and Chelsea
Financial services companies established in 1995
Mitsubishi Estate